Leptarma biju, commonly known as a tree-spider crab, is a species of crab endemic to the mangroves in Kerala, India, and is noted for its unique root climbing behavior for which it gets its namesake. A member of the Leptarma genus, the crustaceans' defining physical traits include a square-like body (or carapace) with yellow and purple splotches, long walking legs with hook-like appendages for climbing, and the unique structure of their gonopods. Additionally, they have large eyes that are positioned beyond their external orbital teeth, which allows them to get a better view of their surroundings. They are presumed to behave nocturnally and climb the roots of mangrove trees at low tides. Their purple and yellow coloration is thought to be an evolutionary form of camouflage that hides the crabs from their predators. This is the first species of Leptarma that has been identified in India. 

Leptarma biju was discovered in Kerala, India at the mouth of the Chittari River by carcinologists Dr. Suvarna S. Devi from Department of Aquatic Biology and Fisheries [University of Kerala] and Prof. Ng, P. K. L., Head of Lee Kong Chian National History museum at Singapore in 2020. Investigators came across a few specimens of the new species climbing granite pylons under a bridge near a large patch of mangroves and collected them for further analysis. Some hypothesize that these crustaceans have successfully evaded discovery for so long due to their small size, nocturnal behavior, and camouflage coloration. Additionally, researchers have noted the many challenges and dangers that make exploring mangrove ecosystems at night difficult. Leptarma biju received its scientific name in honor of the Head of the Department of Aquatic Biology and Fisheries at the University of Kerala, Dr. Appukuttannair Biju Kumar, who is credited with the discovery.

References 

Fauna of India
Decapods